The Red Bull Drifting World Championship is a non-championship all-star drifting contest sponsored by Red Bull energy drink and hosted by IMG and Slipstream Global Marketing, the organizers behind Formula D. The event took place at the Port of Long Beach in Long Beach, California on November 15–16, 2008.

Announced prior to the Las Vegas Formula D round on July 14, at $50,000, it boasts of the largest prize money in a drifting contest and the largest TV production for a drift contest.

The inaugural event was won by Rhys Millen, incidentally sponsored by Red Bull, taking home $25,000.

Criteria for eligibility
As there are 32 places for the event, drivers from all over the world are given a place should they meet these following criteria:
Finish at the Top 16 in the Formula D points table
Become the championship winner at these following oversea drifting events listed below, should that not happen, they are eligible to take up any available runner up spot should it be offered to them.
D1NZ (New Zealand)
Drift Mania Canadian Championship (Canada)
Drift Australia (Australia)
European Drift Championship (United Kingdom)
International Drift Series (Germany)
Pro Drift European Series (Ireland)
Nordic Drifting Championship (Scandinavia)
D1 Grand Prix (Japan)
NZ Drift Series (New Zealand)
Have been D1GP title holder in the past years
Have won the exhibition Formula D Singapore event

Venue
Taking place on  lot of newly laided up asphalt on Port of Long Beach, in a course known as "Pier S".

The entire venue had to be built from scratch, however temporary. Altogether, the venue in all, accounting for three grandstands, borrowed from those of the Long Beach Grand Prix and the 2,000 seating for VIP and sponsor are designed to accommodate up to 25,000 spectators.

Drivers who had driven on the track are said to be capable of reaching  during test runs.

List of invited drivers

With the exception of Formula D, each series are allocated two entries, including D1GP, who following negotiation, were given six invites

When negotiation broke down, D1 drivers were discouraged from taking invites, therefore they were approached directly by the FD management to find out that they invited entrants, the former D1GP champions in particular, had to decline their entries for the reason of scheduling conflicts. Kumakubo declined his as he was due to take part in a drift demo in Dubai, Kazama, despite no longer involved in the series, declined because of schedule clash.

Former D1GP judge, competitor and Super GT driver, Orido was forced to decline his invitation as he was competing in the WTCC Guia Race at Macau on the same weekend, as was fellow judge and returning competitor Taniguchi, was taking part in a Super Taikyu race in Japan.

Other than that,  and 2003 champion, Imamura declined his as he was unable to attend, the 2007 champion Kawabata declined his entry, but it was revealed that "conflict of interest" led them to decline. Saito, who originally accepted his entry, was forced to decline his entry for the same reason, although it was rumored that he placed two cars in a container to make its way to the event. Millen backed this claim of the organisation's bullying tactic during an interview

Only one FD driver, Tuerck, declined for budgetary reason as he is lacking a title sponsor, funding could not stretch for the event, therefore Mohan took his place. Santos, Bolger and Ruiterman made up the rest of the available slot.

Qualifying

Knockout stage

Notes

References

External links
Official Red Bull site
Official Formula D site

Formula D
Drifting World Championship